A medieval pageant is a form of procession traditionally associated with both secular and religious rituals, often with a narrative structure. Pageantry was an important aspect of medieval European seasonal festivals, in particular around the celebration of Corpus Christi, which began after the thirteenth century. This festival reenacted the entire history of the world, in processional performance, from Bible's Genesis to the Apocalypse, employing hundreds of performers and mobile scenic elements. Plays were performed on mobile stages, called waggons, that traveled through towns so plays could be watched consecutively. Each waggon was sponsored by a guild who wrote, designed, and acted in the plays.

Other pageants in the Christian world have centered on Saints' festivals, Carnival (Mardi Gras), and Easter, while vernacular agrarian festivals have celebrated seasonal events such as the harvest, and the Summer and Winter solstices.

Drawing on this medieval tradition contemporary artists such as Bread and Puppet Theater, the Welfare State, In the Heart of the Beast Puppet and Mask Theatre, Spiral Q, and Superior Concept Monsters have used pageants as a potent community-based performance form.

Notable examples
The processional giants and dragons of Belgium and France are a set of folkloric manifestations which have been inscribed by UNESCO on the lists of Intangible Cultural Heritage in 2008, originally proclaimed in November 2005. They include:

In Belgium:
 Ducasse d'Ath
 Ducasse de Mons
 Meyboom of Brussels
 Ommegang van Dendermonde
 Ommegang van Mechelen

In France:
 Cassel: Reuze Papa and Reuze Maman
 Douai: Gayant, Marie Cagenon, Fillon, Jacquot, Binbin
 Pézenas: le Poulain
 Tarascon: la Tarasque

Also see
Mystery play - Medieval plays focused on the presentation of Bible stories in churches as tableaux with accompanying antiphonal song.

References

Walking
Christian worship and liturgy
Christian processions